Evelio Menjivar-Ayala (born August 14, 1970) is a Salvadoran priest of the Catholic Church who serves as auxiliary bishop for the Archdiocese of Washington.

Biography
On May 29, 2004, Menjivar-Ayala was ordained to the priesthood. Pope Francis appointed Menjivar-Ayala auxiliary bishop for the Archdiocese of Washington on December 19, 2022.  On February 21, 2023, Menjivar-Ayala was consecrated as a bishop.

See also

 Catholic Church hierarchy
 Catholic Church in the United States
 Historical list of the Catholic bishops of the United States
 List of Catholic bishops of the United States
 Lists of patriarchs, archbishops, and bishops

References

External links
Roman Catholic Archdiocese of Washington Official Site

Episcopal succession

 

1970 births 
Living people
American Roman Catholic priests
Bishops appointed by Pope Francis